"Hey Joe" is an American song and rock standard from the 1960s.

Hey Joe may also refer to:

 "Hey Joe!", a 1953 song by Carl Smith and Frankie Laine
 "Hey Joe", a 1983 song by Daniel Johnston from the album Hi, How Are You
 "Hey Joe" (Blitzen Trapper song), 2012
 Hey Joe / Radio Ethiopia, 1977 EP by Patti Smith Group, including a cover version of the 1960s song

See also
Eh Joe, a play for television, written by Samuel Beckett in 1965